Bogdan Vaštšuk (born 4 October 1995) is an Estonian professional footballer who plays as an attacking midfielder for Irish club Sligo Rovers and the Estonia national team.

Club career

Reading
In early January 2016, Vaštšuk returned to Reading following his loan deal with Farnborough.

On 9 May 2016, Reading confirmed that they would not be renewing Vaštšuk's contract.

Riga
On 24 August 2016, Vaštšuk signed for Riga FC.

Levski Sofia loan
On 21 August 2018, Levski Sofia announced the signing of Vaštšuk on loan for the 2018–19 season, with an option to make the move permanent at the end of the season.

FCI Levadia
On 23 August 2019, Vaštšuk signed for FCI Levadia.

Stal Mielec
On 20 July 2022, he joined Ekstraklasa side Stal Mielec on a two-year contract.

Sligo Rovers
On 5 January 2023, Vaštšuk signed for League of Ireland Premier Division club Sligo Rovers on a two-year deal with the option of a third.

International career
He made his debut for Estonia national football team on 24 March 2021 in a World Cup qualifier against the Czech Republic.

Personal life
Vaštšuk is of Ukrainian descent by his paternal grandparents, who are from Rivne and Donetsk Oblast in Ukraine.

Career statistics

Club

Honours
Riga
Latvian Higher League: 2018
Latvian Football Cup: 2018

Levadia Tallinn
Meistriliiga: 2021
Estonian Cup: 2020–21

References

External links
 Profile at Levskisofia.info

1995 births
Living people
Footballers from Tallinn
Estonian people of Ukrainian descent
Estonian footballers
Estonia youth international footballers
Estonia under-21 international footballers
Estonia international footballers
Association football midfielders
FCI Tallinn players
Reading F.C. players
Farnborough F.C. players
Riga FC players
PFC Levski Sofia players
FCI Levadia Tallinn players
FC Vorskla Poltava players
Stal Mielec players
Sligo Rovers F.C. players
Esiliiga players
Meistriliiga players
Southern Football League players
Latvian Higher League players
First Professional Football League (Bulgaria) players
Ekstraklasa players
Estonian expatriate footballers
Estonian expatriate sportspeople in England
Expatriate footballers in England
Estonian expatriate sportspeople in Russia
Expatriate footballers in Russia
Estonian expatriate sportspeople in Latvia
Expatriate footballers in Latvia
Estonian expatriate sportspeople in Bulgaria
Expatriate footballers in Bulgaria
Estonian expatriate sportspeople in Ukraine
Expatriate footballers in Ukraine
Estonian expatriate sportspeople in Poland
Expatriate footballers in Poland
Estonian expatriate sportspeople in Ireland
Expatriate association footballers in the Republic of Ireland